Tzibte Yux, Tzib Te Yux, or Tzib'te Yux, is a Preceramic rock shelter and archaeological site in the Rio Blanco National Park, Toledo, Belize. It is thought to have been occupied by Palaeoindian settlers during 10500 BC6500 BC.

Description 
Its floor is relatively flat and composed of sediments, predominantly jute snail shells deposited by former pre-Columbian inhabitants.

Fishtail- and Lowe-style stemmed bifacial points have been recovered from Tzibte Yux, the former dated 10450 cal BC10085 cal BC, the latter 8275 cal BC6650 cal BC. Human remains have also been recovered from the rock shelter.

Study 
Tzibte Yux was discovered by the Uxbenka Archaeological Project in 2009. A piece of charcoal found at the bottom of a red clay layer in Unit 1, some 23 in (58 cm) below the floor's surface, was dated to 10571 cal BC10526 cal BC. Most material in other units produced dates within 10500 cal BC6500 cal BC, though Unit 7 yielded a later date of 890 cal AD975 cal AD at 18.5 in (47 cm) below surface.

Notes

References

External links 
 Uxbenka Archaeological Project

Buildings and structures in Belize
Paleo-Indian period
Hunter-gatherers
Mesoamerica
Pleistocene life
Pleistocene North America
Pre-Columbian archaeology
Archaeological cultures of North America